McPartland is a surname. Notable people with the surname include:

Jimmy McPartland (1907–1991), American cornetist and one of the originators of Chicago Jazz
Marian McPartland (1918–2013), English jazz pianist, composer, writer, and the radio host of Marian McPartland's Piano Jazz
Michael McPartland (born 1939), English Roman Catholic priest
Richard McPartland (1905–1957), the older brother of Jimmy McPartland, and he was an early member of the Austin High School Gang
Stephen McPartland (born 1976), English politician
 Conall Ballach Mac Parthaláin, a 15th-century Irish author
 Diarmaid Bacach mac Parthalain, brother of above Conall and also a 15th-century Irish author

See also
Frank McPartland Three-Decker, historic triple decker at 61 Paine Street in Worcester, Massachusetts
James McPartland Three-Decker, historic triple decker at 17 Pond Street in Worcester, Massachusetts
Marian McPartland's Piano Jazz with Steely Dan

Anglicised Irish-language surnames